Huang Longshi 黃龍士 (1651/1654 – ?, also known as Huang Yuetian) is known as one of the greatest go players in history.

Biography 
Huang Longshi was said to be born around Shunzhi 8 or 11 during the Qing Dynasty (1651/1654). He was said to have died in his forties, but the exact date is unknown. Huang was born in Jiangyan near Taixian in China. His family was poor and he found that he could neglect his studies. However, he did not stop studying go, and soon become a strong enough player to earn money for his family. By the time Huang was 16, he was the guoshou (national champion). He played a match with Sheng Dayou who was one of the strongest players of the older generation of champions. Huang pulled off a stunning 7 game victory in the match. He would continue defeating many top players, and would be praised by the go world. 

Many people would now refer to him as Longshi, the Prodigy instead of his actual name. There is an excerpt about this in Seeing off Huang the Prodigy by Du Jun. It contained the following ;

While Huang gained most of reputation, he had a handful of rivals. There was only one other person in China who could match him, and that was Zhou Donghou. Although Huang would beat Zhou many times, Zhou was the one giving Huang advice to become stronger. 

During the latter time of his life, Huang stayed as a house guest with Xu Xingyou. They would play many go games, of which Huang won. However, every once in a while when Xu would win a game, he would brag to his guests that he had beaten Huang. Once during one of their games, Huang would whisper to Xu that his skill was so superior that he had ought to give Xu a three-stone handicap. This had turned in the three stone Games of Blood and Tears, one of Huang's masterpieces. There was a story that had said Xu was the cause of Huang's death; seducing him with wine and women. It was said that Huang had coped with it for a while, until he died of a stroke. However, the story has been considered apocryphal as Huang and Xu were on a teacher-pupil relationship and Xu was very flattering of Huang. At the time of his death, there was no record that he had left behind a wife or children. Only his masterpieces survived.

Go playing style 
He was also known for his contribution to go theory. He would use a lot of forcing moves to give his opponent inefficient shapes, and would attack while gaining territory. He certainly had a unique style of go. He would play moves that were normal, that looked plain and clear. This left his opponents not knowing what to do, and if they would try to muscle him out, he would catch them with a surprising move or attack a weak point.

Quotes 
He has been praised many times during his life and after his death. Famous book publisher Deng Yuanhui had this to say about Huang;

Huang was also regarded as one of the Fourteen Sages of ancient China by his contemporaries.

Go Seigen, considered to be one of the best go players of the 20th century, and of all time, had also commented on Huang. He had said that if Huang were alive during modern times, he would be a 13 dan. He also went on to say that Huang was at least the level of Honinbo Dosaku. Honinbo Dosaku is considered by many to be the greatest go player of all time.

Even with all this praise, Huang is barely known anywhere outside of China. Much of this had come from Inoue Inseki's impressions of Chinese go players during the 17th century in his famous book Hatsuyorun. He had said that Chinese players would have to take senaisen (handicap) from the top Japanese players, although there is no mention of Huang. This led many to believe that all Chinese go players were no match to the Japanese go players.

Hayashi Genbi had also said something along the lines of Chinese players being inferior, although he said this about Huang, "Huang Yuetian and Xu Xingyou are known as recent champions of the Qing era. In my opinion, for Yuetian this must be so, but for Xingyou, judging by the games given in this book (Gokyo Seimyo) he is far behind."

External links 
 Story at MSO World
 Biography at Sensei's Library

1650s births
Chinese Go players
Qing dynasty people
Sportspeople from Jiangsu
People from Taizhou, Jiangsu
1700s deaths
17th-century Go players